Pedicularia splendida is a species of sea snail, a marine gastropod mollusk in the family Ovulidae, one of the families of cowry allies.

Description
The length of the shell attains 10.5 mm.

Distribution
This species was found on the Hyères Seamount, Northeast Atlantic

References

 Lorenz F., 2009. Two new Pediculariidae from Hyères Seamount, eastern central Atlantic (Gastropoda: Cypraeoidea). Acta Conchyliorum 10: 87-94.
 Lorenz F. & Fehse D. (2009) The living Ovulidae. A manual of the families of allied cowries: Ovulidae, Pediculariidae and Eocypraeidae. Hackenheim: Conchbooks.

Pediculariinae
Gastropods described in 2009